This page describes the qualifying procedure for the 2010 European Women's Handball Championship.

Qualification system

Seeding 
The draw for the qualification round was held on 24 March 2009 at the EHF headquarters, in Vienna. The host countries, Norway and Denmark, are directly qualified. The remaining 29 teams were divided into several pots according to the "EHF Women's National Team Ranking", and were successfully drawn so that each qualification group contained one team from each pot. The two lowest ranked teams, Finland and Great Britain, participated in a pre-qualification tournament to decide the 28th spot.

Playing dates
Pre-qualification: September 2009
Rounds 1 and 2: 14–18 October 2009
Rounds 3 and 4: 31 March – 4 April 2010
Rounds 5 and 6: 26–30 May 2010

Tiebreakers
If two or more teams are equal on points on completion of the group matches, the following criteria are applied to determine the rankings.
 Higher number of points obtained in the group matches played among the teams in question.
 Superior goal difference from the group matches played among the teams in question.
 Higher number of goals scored in the group matches played among the teams in question.
 If, after applying criteria 1) to 3) to several teams, two or more teams still have an equal ranking, the criteria 1) to 3) will be reapplied to determine the ranking of these teams. If this procedure does not lead to a decision, criteria 5), 6) and 7) will apply.
 Superior goal difference from all group matches played.
 Higher number of goals scored in all group matches played.
 Drawing of lots.

Pre-Qualification 
The two pre-qualification matches were played on 23 and 26 September. Great Britain won 41–37 on aggregate score and advanced to qualification group 3.

Groups 
The draw for the qualification round defined the groups shown below. A provisional match schedule was elaborated and distributed to all national federations taking part in this round.

Key:
Teams highlighted in green qualified for the tournament.

Group 1

Group 2

Group 3

Group 4

Group 5

Group 6

Group 7

References 

 
Qualification for handball competitions